Brice Delval (born July 15, 1999) is an Algerian-French Muay Thai fighter.

Delval is a former S1 World Champion and has challenged for the ONE Muay Thai Bantamweight World Championship in 2019.

Biography and career
Born in Nice on July 15, 1999, Brice Delval grew up on the African island of Réunion, off the coast of Madagascar.

At the age of 13, Delval left Réunion for Paris to pursue a Muay Thai career, where he joined the Mahmoudi Gym in Bonneuil-sur-Marne shortly after.

On August 12, 2016, he defeated Sae Sor. Ploenchit via second-round TKO to win the S1 World Championship 138lb title.

Brice Delval made his ONE Championship debut by challenging Nong-O Gaiyanghadao for the ONE Bantamweight Muay Thai World Championship at ONE Championship: Immortal Triumph on September 6, 2019. After five rounds, Delval lost by split decision.

Delval returned to ONE on January 10, 2020, at ONE Championship: A New Tomorrow, facing Muangthai PKSaenchaimuaythaigym. Despite keeping the fight close and competitive, Delval was unable to clinch a victory and lost by split decision once again.

Titles and accomplishments

Muay Thai
 Onesongchai Promotion
 2016 S1 World Championship 138lbs. Champion

Muay Thai record

|-  style="background:#FFBBBB;"
| 2020-03-07|| Loss ||align=left| Ibrahim Konaté||  | KFWC Savate Pro || Clermont-Ferrand, France || Decision (Unanimous)  || 3 || 2:00 
|-
|-  style="background:#FFBBBB;"
| 2020-01-10|| Loss ||align=left| Muangthai PKSaenchaimuaythaigym ||  |ONE Championship: A New Tomorrow || Bangkok, Thailand || Decision (Split) || 3 || 3:00 
|-
|- style="background:#FFBBBB;"
| 2019-09-06|| Loss|| align="left" | Nong-O Gaiyanghadao || ONE Championship: Immortal Triumph || Ho Chi Minh City, Vietnam|| Decision (Split)|| 5 || 3:00
|-
! style=background:white colspan=9 |
|-  style="background:#cfc;"
| 2018-05-26|| Win ||align=left| Alessio D'Angelo || Wolf of the Ring || Milan, Italy || TKO (Injury) || 1 ||
|-  style="background:#FFBBBB;"
| 2018-02-27|| Loss ||align=left| Bangpleenoi 96Penang || Lumpinee Stadium || Bangkok, Thailand || Decision || 5 || 3:00
|-  style="background:#c5d2ea
| 2018-01-27|| Draw ||align=left|  Maksim Petkevich || Thai Boxe Mania 2018 || Turin, Italy || Decision || 3 || 3:00
|-  style="background:#FFBBBB;"
| 2017-12-31|| Loss ||align=left| Zhang Chenglong || SEF || China || Decision || 3 || 3:00
|-  style="background:#cfc;"
| 2017-06-29 || Win ||align=left| Janjao Sitsongpeenong || Best Of Siam XI || Paris, France || Decision|| 5 || 3:00
|-  style="background:#cfc;"
| 2017-05-27 || Win ||align=left| Padsaenlek Rachanon || THAI FIGHT Italy || Turin, Italy || Decision || 3 || 3:00
|-  style="background:#FFBBBB;"
| 2017-02-25 || Loss||align=left| Ren Hiramoto || K-1 World GP 2017 Lightweight Championship Tournament, Quarter Finals || Tokyo, Japan || Decision (Majority) || 3 || 3:00
|-  style="background:#cfc;"
| 2017-01-28 || Win ||align=left| Mathias Gallo Cassarino || Thai Boxe Mania 2017 || Turin, Italy || Decision || 3 || 3:00
|-  style="background:#cfc;"
| 2016-08-27 || Win ||align=left| Liu Jie || Topking World Series || Chengdu, China || Decision || 3 || 3:00
|-  style="background:#cfc;"
| 2016-08-12|| Won ||align=left| Sae Sor Ploenchit || S1 / Onesongchai Promotion || Bangkok, Thailand || TKO || 2 || 
|-
! style=background:white colspan=9 |
|-  style="background:#cfc;"
| 2015-12-13 || Win ||align=left| Myk Estlick || John's 50th Birthday Party Event || Radcliffe, England || Decision || 3 || 3:00
|-  style="background:#cfc;"
| 2015-05-23 || Win ||align=left| Rustam Vyntu || Wolf of the Ring || Italy || Decision || 3 || 3:00
|-
| colspan=9 | Legend:

See also
List of male kickboxers

References

French male kickboxers
French Muay Thai practitioners
1999 births
Living people
ONE Championship kickboxers